Adoxophyes lacertana is a species of moth of the family Tortricidae first described by Józef Razowski in 2013. It is found on Seram Island of Indonesia. The habitat consists of dipterocarp forests and secondary forests.

The wingspan is about 25 mm for males and 18 mm for females. The forewings are cream, sparsely sprinkled with rust. The markings are rust with darker marginal spots. The hindwings are cream.

Etymology
The species name refers to the shape of the aedeagus and is derived from Latin lacertus (meaning a strong arm).

References

Moths described in 2013
Adoxophyes
Moths of Indonesia